Las Vegas Lady is a 1975 American crime film directed by Noel Nosseck, and starring Stella Stevens, Stuart Whitman, George DiCenzo, Lynne Moody, Linda Scruggs, Joseph Della Sorte, Hank Robinson, and Karl Lukas. In this heist film Stella Stevens stars as a thief who enlists her friends – a trapeze artist and a magician's aide – to help her make off with $500,000 in casino cash. The film was released by Crown International Pictures on June 1, 1975.

Plot
In Las Vegas, Lucky and two of her girlfriends, Carol and Lisa, plan to steal half a million dollars from the sadistic manager of the Circus Circus Casino. A shadowy man is their contact and organizer. Each of the women could be a weak link in a scheme that has to be flawless: Lucky's boyfriend is a security officer at the casino, Lisa is a trapeze artist who's now plagued with vertigo, and Carol is in debt to a nasty thug – plus, as a Black woman, she's subject to additional harassment. Can the gals pull off the heist, or is the plan, with its mysterious organizer, too complicated to succeed?

Cast
Stella Stevens as Lucky
Stuart Whitman as Vic
George DiCenzo as Eversull
Lynne Moody as Carol
Linda Scruggs as Lisa
Joseph Della Sorte as A.C.
Hank Robinson as Tully
Karl Lukas as Connors
Emilia Dallenbach as Goldie
Andrew Stevens as Denny
Max Starky as Mr. Cramer
Frank Bonner as Claude
Walter Smith as Milt
Jack Gordon as Melendez
Stephanie Faulkner as Judy

References

External links

1975 crime films
American crime films
1975 films
Crown International Pictures films
1970s English-language films
Films directed by Noel Nosseck
1970s American films